China poblana is considered the traditional style of dress of women in Mexico, although in reality it only belonged to some urban zones in the middle and southeast of the country, before its disappearance in the second half of the 19th century.  Poblanas are women of Puebla.

Fashion design of the china dress 

The fashion design of the china poblana dress is attributed to Catarina de San Juan, although it certainly incorporates elements from the diverse cultures that were mixed in New Spain during three centuries of Spanish rule.

According to descriptions written in the 19th century, the era in which the dress was very popular in various cities in the middle and southeast of Mexico, china outfit is made up of the following garments:
A white blouse, with fringing and embroiderywork of silk and beads, in geometric and floral designs in bright colors. The blouse was sufficiently low-cut to allow part of the neck and the bosom to be seen, which scandalized to no end the "proper" women of nineteenth century Mexican society.
A skirt called castor (or, "beaver"), named after the material it was made from. According to some historians, castor was used by well-heeled ladies of the household to make the underskirts of their indigenous maids. The castor skirt was decorated with sequins and camarones (literally, shrimp) that formed geometric and floral shapes. Folkloric dance groups have revived a version that has the coat of arms of Mexico embroidered with sequins, beads, and bugles (a type of bead).
A white slip with enchilada stitching, that is to say with the lower hem  criss-crossed with zig-zagged lacework. The slip of a china poblana would peek out under the castor skirt, and served to keep the form of a woman attired in the china dress from showing in silhouette.
A loop that held up the castor and the slip to the waist of the woman who wore it. The loop may or may not have been adorned with embroidery, or woven in brocade-style.
A shawl, sometimes made fine with silk, or in most cases with bobbles. The shawl is a very common garment in Mexico, even today. Women use it to cover themselves from the cold, but it was also used to carry babies or any other thing that was difficult to carry barehanded due to size and weight. The bobble shawl, which was most commonly used in china dresses, was woven with threads of blue and white color, and originated in the Otomí town of Santa María del Río (San Luis Potosí).
In some instances, the china was accompanied with a scarf or kerchief of silk to hide any cleavage that might peek out of the blouse. Of these scarves, José María Rivera wrote that "these regularly come home on Sunday only to return to the pawn shop on Monday or Tuesday".
As footwear, 19th century author Manuel Payno pointed out that despite her financial lackings, a china-dress woman would use satin shoes embroidered with silk thread. This type of footwear appears in some nineteenth century Mexican texts as an indicator that the wearer was a "merry woman". Furthermore, the china wearer completed the outfit with beads and jewels that adorned her ears, her cleavage, and her hands.

Cultural representations of la china 

Nineteenth-century descriptions of women wearing the china paint them as simultaneously attractive and too risque for the times. Men saw these women as beautiful for their brown complexion, their "plump" but not "fat" body and face, and, most significantly, their differences from women of higher social strata in their lack of artifices to enhance their beauty. Author José María Rivera notes that if a china woman would have seen a corset, she would have thought it a torture device such as used on Saint Ursula and the Eleven Thousand Virgins; and that her face was not some sort of "cake frosting", an allusion to the "proper" women whose faces would have to be washed to see if the colors run:

In that sense, the wardrobe of the china woman was considered too provocative. Contemporary Mexican journalists and foreigners who knew these women in the first half of the nineteenth century call attention to the way in which the fashion of peasant women showed off their feminine forms, or were an appropriate feature of all the graces that were attributed to these women. A verbal portrait was made of them as excellent dancers of jarabe music popular in that era—like El Atole, El Agualulco, El Palomo and others that form part of the folkloric jarabes of the twentieth century—, also as models of cleanliness and order; of fidelity to "their man" although also seen as very liberal sexually.

Not that much is known about the China Poblana mostly because many know it but there is no actual evidence saying that she did in fact exist. And there for many people argue that because if this it might just be a legend. One thing to keep in mind is that no one had writing utensils and no television and therefore to pass the time they told stories. This is also known as word of mouth and this might just have been one of those stories where it was passed down from generation to generation.

Origins

Origin of the fashion design of la china 

As mentioned in the introduction of this article, the Pueblan origin of the china poblana outfit has been put in doubt on occasion. The correlation between the china—as a popular figure— and the outfit worn by the historic China Poblana—the alluded-to Catarina de San Juan — is a product of the evolution of Mexican culture during the first decades of the 20th century. In fact, las chinas became a well defined meme in the 19th century, a little more than a century after the death of Catarina de San Juan. Writer Gauvin Alexander Bailey points out:

See also 
 Baro't saya
 Charro
 Culture of Mexico
 Textiles of Mexico
 Adelita

References

External links 
 A Mughal Princess in Baroque New Spain - Catarina de San Juan (1606–1688), the china poblana, Gauvin Alexander Bailey, Clark University

Mexican culture
Mexican fashion
Mexican folklore
Puebla